Coleataenia longifolia is a species of grass in the family Poaceae found in North America. Coleataenia longifolia subsp. elongata is listed as a special concern and believed extirpated in Connecticut.

References

Flora of North America
Panicoideae